Dale Dike Reservoir or Dale Dyke Reservoir is a reservoir in the north-east Peak District, in the City of Sheffield, South Yorkshire, England, a mile (1.6 km) west of Bradfield and eight miles (13 km) from the centre of Sheffield, on the Dale Dike, a tributary of the River Loxley.

Along with three other reservoirs around the village of Bradfield – Agden, Damflask and Strines – it was constructed between 1859 and 1864 by the Sheffield Waterworks Company to guarantee a supply of water to power the mills downstream and to supply drinking water to the growing population of Sheffield. The architect was John Gunson.

Great Sheffield Flood 

At 23:30 on 11 March 1864, the day after the reservoir was finally full, the newly built dam failed. Over  of water cascaded down the valley causing the Great Sheffield Flood, which caused massive damage downstream along the Loxley and Don and through the centre of Sheffield, destroying over 5,000 properties and killing 244 people.

The new dam 
It is owned by Yorkshire Water, part of the Kelda Group.

See also 
 List of disasters in Great Britain and Ireland by death toll

References

Sources

Reservoirs of the Peak District
Reservoirs in South Yorkshire
Geography of Sheffield
Dam failures in Europe